Rok Sirk (born 10 September 1993) is a Slovenian footballer who plays for Maribor as a forward.

Honours

Maribor
Slovenian Championship: 2012–13, 2013–14, 2021–22
Slovenian Cup: 2012–13
Slovenian Supercup: 2012, 2013, 2014

Mura
Slovenian Second League: 2017–18

References

External links
NZS profile 

1993 births
Living people
Slovenian footballers
Slovenia youth international footballers
Association football forwards
NK Maribor players
NŠ Mura players
Zagłębie Lubin players
Radomiak Radom players
Slovenian PrvaLiga players
Slovenian Second League players
Ekstraklasa players
I liga players
Slovenian expatriate footballers
Slovenian expatriate sportspeople in Poland
Expatriate footballers in Poland